The 2022–23 season is Tottenham Hotspur's fourth season in the top flight of the English football league system and 38th season in existence. In addition to the domestic league, they are participating in this season's FA Cup and FA League Cup.

Season squad

Transfers

Released

Note: Players will join other clubs after being released or terminated from their contract. Only the following clubs are mentioned when that club signed the player in the same transfer window.

Loans in

Loans out

Transfers in

Transfers out

Pre-season friendlies
To prepare for the upcoming season, Tottenham played a series of friendlies across the world. The club first met Mexican club Club América and Japanese club Tokyo Verdy Beleza in the United States for the 2022 The Women's Cup on 14 and 17 August 2022, respectively. The team then travelled back to England to play Chelsea on 28 August 2022.

Competitions

Overview

Super League

League table

Results summary

Results by round

Matches
The Super League fixtures were announced on 12 July 2022.

FA Cup

Tottenham entered the competition in the fourth round and were drawn home to London City Lionesses. They were then drawn home to Reading.

FA League Cup

Group stage

Knockout phase

Statistics

Appearances
Updated 15 March 2023

Goalscorers
Updated 15 March 2023

The list is sorted by shirt number when total goals are equal.

Own goals

Disciplinary
Updated 15 March 2023

The list is sorted by shirt number when total cards are equal.

Clean sheets 
Updated 15 March 2023

The list is sorted by shirt number when total clean sheets are equal.

See also 
 2022–23 in English football

References 

Tottenham Hotspur Women
Tottenham Hotspur Women
Tottenham Hotspur Women